Kanadaseaga (aka Kanadesaga or Kanatasaka or Kanadasaga or Canasadego or Ganûndase?'ge? or Seneca Castle or Canadasaga), was a major village, perhaps a capital, of the Seneca nation of the Iroquois Confederacy in west-central New York State, United States. It was located between the northern ends of Seneca and Canandaigua lakes, one and a half miles northwest of the present-day city of Geneva in the township of Seneca. The village was situated on both sides of Kanadaseaga Creek. The Seneca established this village at least as early as 1687.  It was likely established by the former residents of Ganondagan, after its destruction by the French.

Around 1754, the Senecas moved north from the nearby New Ganechstage village (and prior to that, the White Springs village) to a settlement that would become known as Kanadesaga.

A blockhouse was built here in 1756 by Sir William Johnson, the remains of which were in existence in 1779.   During the Revolutionary War, the British added defensive fortifications against the Americans. The village contained about sixty well-built houses.

Long known for being one of the most powerful Iroquois towns, it was destroyed by the American army's Sullivan Expedition of 1779, on September 9, during the American Revolutionary War. American forces were seeking to punish the Iroquois for their raids and attacks on frontier settlements, especially in the Mohawk, Cherry and Schoharie valleys.

References

Iroquois populated places
1779 disestablishments in the United States
Pre-historic cities in the United States
Former populated places in New York (state)
Former Native American populated places in the United States
Native American history of New York (state)